Cair Paravel Latin School (often referred to as CPLS or just Cair Paravel) is a private, coeducational, non-profit, non-denominational Christian school located in Topeka, Kansas, United States.  The school was founded in 1980.  With over 400 students, Cair Paravel is the largest school in Kansas offering a Classical Christian education.  Cair Paravel is a member of the Association of Classical Christian Schools.

Academics
Cair Paravel is both Christ-Centered and Classical.  The school teaches all subjects as parts of an integrated whole with Biblical scriptures at the center.   The curriculum of Cair Paravel is based on the Trivium and emphasizes grammar, logic, and rhetoric.  Grammar means the fundamental terms, rules and principles of each subject.  Logic means the ordered relationship of particulars in each subject.  Rhetoric means the clear and eloquent expression of the truths and principles of each subject.

Fine arts
Cair Paravel maintains fine art curricula including orchestra, drama, art, and choir.

Athletics
  Cair Paravel offers the following athletic programs for the middle and upper school:
Football
Cheerleading
Boys basketball
Girls basketball 
Golf
Boys soccer
Girls soccer
Boys volleyball 
Girls volleyball
Track
Baseball

References

Further reading
 United States Department of the Interior, National Park Service, National Register of Historic Places submission for Topeka High School, Shawnee County, Kansas, (22 April 2005)
 Gone But Not Forgotten: The Lost Schools of Topeka, Shawnee County Historical Society, Bulletin Number 67, pp 52–53, November 1990.

External links
Cair Paravel-Latin School website
Association of Classical Christian Schools website

Buildings and structures in Topeka, Kansas
Christian schools in Kansas
Classical Christian schools
Educational institutions established in 1980
Private elementary schools in Kansas
Private high schools in Kansas
Private middle schools in Kansas
Schools in Shawnee County, Kansas
Education in Topeka, Kansas
National Register of Historic Places in Topeka, Kansas
1980 establishments in Kansas